Pedro Miguel Pina Eugénio (born 26 June 1990) is a Portuguese professional footballer who plays as a right winger or a right-back for Saudi Arabian club Al-Adalah.

He spent most of his career abroad, making 143 appearances and scoring 31 goals in the Bulgarian top flight for four clubs, including three spells at Beroe. He also played in Turkey and Kazakhstan, and had a brief stint in his country's second tier with Farense.

Club career
Eugénio was born in Faro, Algarve. As a youth player he represented four clubs, starting his development with S.C. Olhanense and finishing it with S.L. Benfica. He made his senior debut in 2009 with União Desportiva Messinense in the regional championships, then switched to Algarve neighbours Louletano D.C. in the third division for the following season.

In the 2011–12 campaign, Eugénio represented S.C. Farense in the fourth tier. On 30 July 2012, after a short trial period, he joined Bulgarian side PFC Beroe Stara Zagora on a three-year deal. He appeared in his first match as a professional on 11 August, playing the full 90 minutes in a 4–0 home win against POFC Botev Vratsa.

Eugénio returned to his homeland and Farense in January 2014, with the team now in division two. In the summer, he returned to Bulgaria with FC Haskovo.

On 9 November 2014, Eugénio scored after dribbling two opponents in a 90-meter run, but in a 2–4 home loss to PFC CSKA Sofia. He signed with FC Vereya in July 2016, arriving from fellow First Professional Football League club PFC Cherno More Varna.

Eugénio returned to Beroe on 16 June 2017. This was the most prolific season of his career, coming third in goalscorers with 16 in 31 games; this included a hat-trick on 17 February in a 4–1 win at Cherno More. At its conclusion, he moved to the Turkish TFF First League after signing a two-year contract at Altay S.K. for an undisclosed fee. He left by mutual consent and returned to Beroe in January 2019; that July, Altay were put under a transfer embargo by FIFA until they settled debts of around 1 million Turkish lira with Eugénio and Ivan Ivanov.

Eugénio competed in the Kazakhstan Premier League the following years, representing FC Zhetysu, FC Taraz and FC Astana and being voted player of the 2020 season at the first of those clubs.

On 25 January 2023, Astana announced that Eugénio had left the club following the expiration of his contract. On the same day, Eugénio joined Saudi Professional League side Al-Adalah.

Personal life
Eugénio's father, Rui, was also a footballer and a defender.

Career statistics

Honours
Farense
Terceira Divisão: 2011–12

Beroe
Bulgarian Cup: 2012–13
Bulgarian Supercup: 2013

Astana
Kazakhstan Premier League: 2022

Individual
 Kazakhstan Premier League Top Scorer:  2022

References

External links

1990 births
Living people
People from Faro, Portugal
Sportspeople from Faro District
Portuguese footballers
Association football defenders
Association football wingers
Liga Portugal 2 players
Segunda Divisão players
Louletano D.C. players
S.C. Farense players
First Professional Football League (Bulgaria) players
PFC Beroe Stara Zagora players
FC Haskovo players
PFC Cherno More Varna players
FC Vereya players
TFF First League players
Altay S.K. footballers
Kazakhstan Premier League players
FC Zhetysu players
FC Taraz players
FC Astana players
Saudi Professional League players
Al-Adalah FC players
Portugal youth international footballers
Portuguese expatriate footballers
Expatriate footballers in Bulgaria
Expatriate footballers in Turkey
Expatriate footballers in Kazakhstan
Expatriate footballers in Saudi Arabia
Portuguese expatriate sportspeople in Bulgaria
Portuguese expatriate sportspeople in Turkey
Portuguese expatriate sportspeople in Kazakhstan
Portuguese expatriate sportspeople in Saudi Arabia